Ícaro Cosmo da Rocha commonly known as Ícaro is a professional Brazilian football (soccer) player who plays as a defensive midfielder and a defender for ABC FC.

References

External links

Living people
1993 births
Brazilian footballers
Association football defenders
Coritiba Foot Ball Club players
Londrina Esporte Clube players
Maringá Futebol Clube players
Esporte Clube Santo André players
Tombense Futebol Clube players
Mirassol Futebol Clube players
Associação Atlética Aparecidense players
Campeonato Brasileiro Série A players
Campeonato Brasileiro Série B players
Campeonato Brasileiro Série C players
Campeonato Brasileiro Série D players